Rigoberto Tovar García (March 29, 1946 – March 27, 2005), better known as Rigo Tovar, was a Mexican musician, singer and actor. Famous for his cumbias, Tovar infused traditional Mexican and Latin music with modern instruments like the electric guitar and synthesizer and popular styles such as rock and soul music.

Tovar was born and raised in Matamoros, Tamaulipas. After moving to the neighborhood of East End in Houston, Texas, his musical career began to take off in the early 1970s. Blending cumbia, tropical, and modern pop rock, he quickly gained a large following. In 1971, Tovar released his first album entitled Matamoros Querido which garnered two hits, "Matamoros Querido" and "Lamento De Amor".

During his career, Tovar broke several attendance records in Mexico and throughout Latin America (many of which still stand to this day), sold over 30 million albums, and continues to influence countless artists of all genres.

Early career and success
Through extensive radio play and touring in Mexico and the United States, Tovar achieved great popularity and success. At the height of his fame, he was known as "El Ídolo de México" (Mexico's Idol) and "El Ídolo de las multitudes" (The Idol of the Masses). The release of the 1976 album, Amor y Cumbia catapulted him to superstar status not only in Mexico but many other areas of Latin America as well as the United States. His adoring public coined the phrase "Rigo es Amor" which is translated in English as "Rigo is Love". This was attributed to the love songs he performed and the passion he poured into them. His music, voice and image were so endearing to so many that he became the living embodiment of love. It was routinely yelled out at his concerts and is still used when people speak of him.

Tovar's other hits include "La Sirenita", "Te tendré que olvidar", "¡Oh, Qué Gusto De Volverte A Ver!", and "Perdóname Mi Amor Por Ser Tan Guapo". He was most successful in the 1970s and 1980s and retired in the late 1990s; however, his music remains popular today. Tovar's musical group, El Conjunto Costa Azul, has gone through numerous line-up changes over the years and is still active today.

"Bigger Than The Pope"
In 1979, Tovar broke the 300,000-person attendance record set in Monterrey, Nuevo León, Mexico earlier that year by Pope John Paul II when the artist performed a free concert at the Santa Catarina River which drew 400,000 concertgoers. Some newspapers reporting on the new attendance record even ran headlines declaring that Tovar was "bigger than the Pope".

Movie roles
Tovar also starred in several movies including Vivir Para Amar (1980), Rigo Es Amor (1980), and El Gran Triunfo (1981).

Personal life
On March 27, 2005, just days shy of his 59th birthday, Tovar died from diabetic complications leading to cardio-respiratory failure. His funeral was held behind closed doors in a notable funeral home located in Mexico City, but fans and some members of his large family entered the funeral service by force. Tovar was cremated and his ashes were thrown onto one of Matamoros' beaches per his wishes.

Legacy
In honor of his legacy, Tovar's hometown of Matamoros, Tamaulipas renamed a main avenue located in the northwest part of the city, Avenida Rigo Tovar.

Discography

Select albums
1972: Matamoros Querido   
1973: Cómo Será La Mujer   
1974: En La Cumbre   
1975: En Acción   
1976: Te Quiero Dijiste...   
1976: Rigo Tovar Y Su Conjunto Costa Azul  
1976: Amor Y Cumbia   
1977: Dos Tardes De Mi Vida   
1978: ¡Oh, Qué Gusto De Volverte A Ver!   
1979: Con Mariachi Vol. 1   
1979: Reflexiona     
1980: Rigo Tovar En Vivo  
1980: Con Mariachi Vol. 2  
1980: Rigo Rock   
1981: Rigo '81   
1982: 10 Años Tropicalísimo   
1982: Sublime Y Bohemio  
1984: De Nuevo En Contacto Musical   
1985: El Músico Chiflado   
1986: Quítate La Máscara   
1986: Con Mariachi Vol. 3    
1989: Baila Mi Ritmo   
1989: La Fiera   
1989: Los Últimos Exitos De Rigo Tovar   
1990: El Ritmo Del Sirenito   
1990: El Sirenito
1993: Rigo El Guapo   
1994: Éxitos Con Banda Vol 1
1994: Exitos Con Banda Vol 2

Select compilations
2003: Sigue Bailando Mi Ritmo
2005: La Historia De Un Ídolo   
2006: Mi Tinajita Y Muchos Éxitos Más...

Select singles
"Matamoros Querido"
"Lamento De Amor" - Number-one hit in Mexico
"Recordando Monterrey"
"Enamorado De Verdad"
"Como Sera La Mujer"
"Pajarillo Montañero"
"Me Quiero Casar"
"El Testamento"
"La Sirenita"
"Amor Libre"
"¡Oh, Qué Gusto De Volverte A Ver!"
"Reflexiona"
"Mi Amiga, Mi Esposa y Mi Amante"
"Cuando Tu Cariño"

See also
 List of Mexican people

External links

 Houston Press Blog Article 
Rigo Tovar Fans
Museum of Rigo Tovar in Internet

References

Mexican songwriters
Male songwriters
People from Matamoros, Tamaulipas
People with vitiligo
1946 births
2005 deaths
Deaths from diabetes
Musicians from Houston
Latin music songwriters
Blind artists
20th-century Mexican male singers